Sidney Peake (7 March 1882 – 1 August 1941) was a British wrestler. He competed in the men's freestyle featherweight at the 1908 Summer Olympics.

References

External links
 

1882 births
1941 deaths
British male sport wrestlers
Olympic wrestlers of Great Britain
Wrestlers at the 1908 Summer Olympics
Place of birth missing